Plankstadt is a municipality in the district of Rhein-Neckar-Kreis, in Baden-Württemberg, Germany.

References

Rhein-Neckar-Kreis